The Egypt Karate Federation is the national body for Karate in Egypt. It's the only association authorised to send Egyptian Karatekas to the Summer Olympics.

Egypt is one of the dominant forces in Sport karate in the world.

References

Sports organizations established in 1970
Karate in Egypt
Karate organizations
Karate